The Family is a Swedish songwriting and music production team consisting of the married couple Joy & Linnéa Deb and Anton Hård Af Segerstad. They have worked with artists such as Fifth Harmony, JoJo, and Måns Zelmerlöw. Together they wrote and composed the Eurovision Song Contest winning song "Heroes" performed by Måns Zelmerlöw in 2015. The song has had huge success and is the third-highest-scoring song in the history of the ESC. "Heroes" also peaked at #1 in 22 countries and was certified 5× Platinum in Sweden.

Biography
The trio first met in 2013 while competing with different songs in the Swedish Eurovision Song Contest (Melodifestivalen). Anton competing with the song "Begging" performed by Anton Ewald which finished in fourth place, and Joy's & Linnea's contribution "You" performed by Robin Stjernberg. "You" won the Swedish ESC and went on to the finals, (also) held in Sweden, Malmö. As from this point they slowly started to collaborate and in 2014 they presented their first contribution to next years ESC (Melodifestivalen) as a production-group with "Echo" performed by Outtrigger.

Now working together they continued their success writing more and bigger hits. In 2016 The Family managed to get four different contributions in the Swedish ESC. -Performed by Lisa Ajax, Ace Wilder, Molly Pettersson Hammar and ISA. The Family were appointed "Songwriter of the year" in the contest.

As of 2016 the Family is based in the Stockholm-based studio Northbound where they've started working more towards the US pop-market. The trio wrote and produced the first record "Top Down" on Fifth Harmony's album Reflection. They also wrote JoJo's comeback single "Save My Soul".

In 2016, "Oh Lord" was released with the British vocal harmony boy band MiC LOWRY. The song was the group's debut single and it was written by The Family, Augustine Grant and Phil Collins, as the song contains lyrics and music from Collins' song "In the Air Tonight".

Songwriting discography

Below is a selection of songs written and produced by The Family.

References

Swedish record producers
Swedish songwriters